"We Walk" is a song by English duo The Ting Tings from their debut studio album, We Started Nothing (2008). It was released as the album's sixth and final single on 23 February 2009. "Fruit Machine" was originally set to be released two weeks before the release of "We Walk" as a download-only single; however, this was cancelled.

Critical reception
Tony Robert Whyte of Drowned in Sound wrote that "We Walk" is "a lush ballad in hiding that's too scared to show its true spots for fear it'll be laughed out of town by cool-as indie types, its incessant cowbell effects eventually tiring the attention despite the album's most heartfelt vocal from White." Alexis Petridis of The Guardian stated that the song "prove[s] White and De Martino can do glossy and depthless at will, but pop perfection comes less easily."

Music video
The music video for "We Walk", directed by Ben Ib, features Katie White and Jules De Martino walking in a park at night, with many of their duplicates around them in frozen poses.

Track listings
UK promo CD single
"We Walk" (Radio Edit) – 3:31
"We Walk" (Instrumental) – 4:04

UK limited 12" single
A. "We Walk" – 4:04
B1. "Fruit Machine" (Dave Spoon Televized Mix) – 5:53 	
B2. "Fruit Machine" (Bimbo Jones Remix) – 6:08

Charts

References

2008 songs
2009 singles
Songs written by Katie White
Songs written by Jules De Martino
Columbia Records singles
The Ting Tings songs